Harold Sharratt (16 December 1929 – 19 August 2002) was an English footballer who represented Great Britain at the 1956 Summer Olympics. Sharratt, who played as a goalkeeper, remained an amateur player throughout his career, working as a school teacher during the week. Sharratt played for non-league clubs including Wigan Athletic and Bishop Auckland, and also played as an amateur in the Football League for Blackpool, Oldham Athletic, Charlton Athletic and Nottingham Forest.

Career
Sharratt started his career at Wigan Athletic. He spent three seasons at the club, making 86 appearances in all competitions.

Sharratt made his only League appearance for Blackpool in a 4–0 defeat at Tottenham Hotspur on 18 October 1952, deputising for George Farm. Farm had played 111 consecutive Football League games for the Tangerines, but he was making his debut for Scotland in their victory over Wales in the British International Championship the same day.

References

1929 births
2002 deaths
English footballers
Wigan Athletic F.C. players
Blackpool F.C. players
Bishop Auckland F.C. players
Oldham Athletic A.F.C. players
Charlton Athletic F.C. players
Nottingham Forest F.C. players
English Football League players
Footballers at the 1956 Summer Olympics
Olympic footballers of Great Britain
Footballers from Wigan
Association football goalkeepers